William Roscoe Campbell (August 6, 1920 – October 28, 1974) was an American football player who played five seasons in the National Football League (NFL) with the Chicago Cardinals and New York Bulldogs. He was drafted by the Chicago Cardinals in the 17th round of the 1943 NFL Draft. He played college football at the University of Oklahoma and attended Pawhuska High School in Pawhuska, Oklahoma. Campbell was also a member of the Winnipeg Blue Bombers of the Western Interprovincial Football Union.

References

External links
Just Sports Stats

1920 births
1974 deaths
Players of American football from Oklahoma
American football centers
American football linebackers
American football tackles
Canadian football centres
American players of Canadian football
Oklahoma Sooners football players
Chicago Cardinals players
New York Bulldogs players
Winnipeg Blue Bombers players
People from Pawhuska, Oklahoma